Sonic hedgehog protein (SHH) is encoded for by the SHH gene. The protein is named after the character Sonic the Hedgehog.

This signaling molecule is key in regulating embryonic morphogenesis in all animals. SHH controls organogenesis and the organization of the central nervous system, limbs, digits and many other parts of the body. Sonic hedgehog is a morphogen that patterns the developing embryo using a concentration gradient characterized by the French flag model. This model has a non-uniform distribution of SHH molecules which governs different cell fates according to concentration. Mutations in this gene can cause holoprosencephaly, a failure of splitting in the cerebral hemispheres, as demonstrated in an experiment using SHH knock-out mice in which the forebrain midline failed to develop and instead only a single fused telencephalic vesicle resulted. 

Sonic hedgehog still plays a role in differentiation, proliferation, and maintenance of adult tissues. Abnormal activation of SHH signaling in adult tissues has been implicated in various types of cancers including breast, skin, brain, liver, gallbladder and many more.

Discovery and naming 
The hedgehog gene (hh) was first identified in the fruit fly Drosophila melanogaster in the classic Heidelberg screens of Christiane Nüsslein-Volhard and Eric Wieschaus, as published in 1980. These screens, which led to the researchers winning a Nobel Prize in 1995 along with developmental geneticist Edward B. Lewis, identified genes that control the segmentation pattern of the Drosophila embryos. The hh loss of function mutant phenotype causes the embryos to be covered with denticles, i.e. small pointy projections resembling the spikes of a hedgehog. Investigations aimed at finding a hedgehog equivalent in vertebrates by Philip Ingham, Andrew P. McMahon and Clifford Tabin revealed three homologous genes.

Two of these genes, desert hedgehog and Indian hedgehog, were named for species of hedgehogs,  while sonic hedgehog was named after the video game character Sonic the Hedgehog. The gene was named by Robert Riddle, a postdoctoral fellow at the Tabin Lab, after his wife Betsy Wilder came home with a magazine containing an advert for the game Sonic the Hedgehog. In the zebrafish, two of the three vertebrate hh genes are duplicated: SHH a and SHH b (formerly described as tiggywinkle hedgehog, named for Mrs. Tiggy-Winkle, a character from Beatrix Potter's books for children) and ihha and ihhb (formerly described as echidna hedgehog, named for the spiny anteater and not for the character Knuckles the Echidna in the Sonic franchise).

Function 
Of the hh homologues, SHH has been found to have the most critical roles in development, acting as a morphogen involved in patterning many systems—including the anterior pituitary, pallium of the brain, spinal cord, lungs, teeth and the thalamus by the zona limitans intrathalamica. In vertebrates, the development of limbs and digits depends on the secretion of sonic hedgehog by the zone of polarizing activity,  located on the posterior side of the embryonic limb bud. Mutations in the human sonic hedgehog gene SHH cause holoprosencephaly type 3 HPE3, as a result of the loss of the ventral midline. The sonic hedgehog transcription pathway has also been linked to the formation of specific kinds of cancerous tumors, including the embryonic cerebellar tumor and medulloblastoma, as well as the progression of prostate cancer tumours. For SHH to be expressed in the developing embryo limbs, a morphogen called fibroblast growth factors must be secreted from the apical ectodermal ridge.

Sonic hedgehog has also been shown to act as an axonal guidance cue. It has been demonstrated that SHH attracts commissural axons at the ventral midline of the developing spinal cord. Specifically, SHH attracts retinal ganglion cell (RGC) axons at low concentrations and repels them at higher concentrations. The absence (non-expression) of SHH has been shown to control the growth of nascent hind limbs in cetaceans (whales and dolphins).

The SHH gene is a member of the hedgehog gene family with five variations of DNA sequence alterations or splice variants. SHH is located on chromosome seven and initiates the production of Sonic Hedgehog protein. This protein sends short- and long-range signals to embryonic tissues to regulate development. If the SHH gene is mutated or absent, the protein Sonic Hedgehog cannot do its job properly. Sonic hedgehog contributes to cell growth, cell specification and formation, structuring and organization of the body plan. This protein functions as a vital morphogenic signaling molecule and plays an important role in the formation of many different structures in developing embryos. The SHH gene affects several major organ systems, such as the nervous system, cardiovascular system, respiratory system and musculoskeletal system. Mutations in the SHH gene can cause malformation of components of these systems, which can result in major problems in the developing embryo. The brain and eyes, for example, can be significantly impacted by mutations in this gene and cause disorders such as Microphthalmia and Holoprosencephaly. Microphthalmia is a condition that affects the eyes, which results in small, underdeveloped tissues in one or both eyes. This can lead to issues ranging from a coloboma to a single small eye to the absence of eyes altogether. Holoprosencephaly is a condition most commonly caused by a mutation of the SHH gene that causes improper separation of the left and right brain and facial dysmorphia. Many systems and structures rely heavily on proper expression of the SHH gene and subsequent sonic hedgehog protein, earning it the distinction of being an essential gene to development.

Patterning of the central nervous system 
The sonic hedgehog (SHH) signaling molecule assumes various roles in patterning the central nervous system (CNS) during vertebrate development. One of the most characterized functions of SHH is its role in the induction of the floor plate and diverse ventral cell types within the neural tube. The notochord—a structure derived from the axial mesoderm—produces SHH, which travels extracellularly to the ventral region of the neural tube and instructs those cells to form the floor plate. Another view of floor plate induction hypothesizes that some precursor cells located in the notochord are inserted into the neural plate before its formation, later giving rise to the floor plate.

The neural tube itself is the initial groundwork of the vertebrate CNS,  and the floor plate is a specialized structure, located at the ventral midpoint of the neural tube. Evidence supporting the notochord as the signaling center comes from studies in which a second notochord is implanted near a neural tube in vivo, leading to the formation of an ectopic floor plate within the neural tube.

Sonic hedgehog is the secreted protein that mediates signaling activities of the notochord and floor plate. Studies involving ectopic expression of SHH in vitro and in vivo result in floor plate induction and differentiation of motor neuron and ventral interneurons. On the other hand, mice mutants for SHH lack ventral spinal cord characteristics. In vitro blocking of SHH signaling using antibodies against it shows similar phenotypes. SHH exerts its effects in a concentration-dependent manner, so that a high concentration of SHH results in a local inhibition of cellular proliferation. This inhibition causes the floor plate to become thin compared to the lateral regions of the neural tube. Lower concentration of SHH results in cellular proliferation and induction of various ventral neural cell types. Once the floor plate is established, cells residing in this region will subsequently express SHH themselves, generating a concentration gradient within the neural tube.

Although there is no direct evidence of a SHH gradient, there is indirect evidence via the visualization of Patched (Ptc) gene expression, which encodes for the ligand binding domain of the SHH receptor throughout the ventral neural tube. In vitro studies show that incremental two- and threefold changes in SHH concentration give rise to motor neuron and different interneuronal subtypes as found in the ventral spinal cord. These incremental changes in vitro correspond to the distance of domains from the signaling tissue (notochord and floor plate) which subsequently differentiates into different neuronal subtypes as it occurs in vitro. Graded SHH signaling is suggested to be mediated through the Gli family of proteins, which are vertebrate homologues of the Drosophila zinc-finger-containing transcription factor Cubitus interruptus (Ci). Ci is a crucial mediator of hedgehog (Hh) signaling in Drosophila. In vertebrates, three different Gli proteins are present, viz. Gli1, Gli2 and Gli3, which are expressed in the neural tube. Mice mutants for Gli1 show normal spinal cord development, suggesting that it is dispensable for mediating SHH activity. However, Gli2 mutant mice show abnormalities in the ventral spinal cord, with severe defects in the floor plate and ventral-most interneurons (V3). Gli3 antagonizes SHH function in a dose-dependent manner, promoting dorsal neuronal subtypes. SHH mutant phenotypes can be rescued in a SHH/Gli3 double mutant. Gli proteins have a C-terminal activation domain and an N-terminal repressive domain.

SHH is suggested to promote the activation function of Gli2 and inhibit repressive activity of Gli3. SHH also seems to promote the activation function of Gli3, but this activity is not strong enough. The graded concentration of SHH gives rise to graded activity of Gli 2 and Gli3,  which promote ventral and dorsal neuronal subtypes in the ventral spinal cord. Evidence from Gli3 and SHH/Gli3 mutants show that SHH primarily regulates the spatial restriction of progenitor domains rather than being inductive, as SHH/Gli3 mutants show intermixing of cell types.

SHH also induces other proteins with which it interacts, and these interactions can influence the sensitivity of a cell towards SHH. Hedgehog-interacting protein (HHIP) is induced by SHH, which in turn attenuates its signaling activity. Vitronectin is another protein that is induced by SHH; it acts as an obligate co-factor for SHH signaling in the neural tube.

There are five distinct progenitor domains in the ventral neural tube: V3 interneurons,  motor neurons (MN), V2, V1, and V0 interneurons (in ventral to dorsal order). These different progenitor domains are established by "communication" between different classes of homeobox transcription factors. (See Trigeminal Nerve.) These transcription factors respond to SHH gradient concentration. Depending upon the nature of their interaction with SHH, they are classified into two groups—class I and class II—and are composed of members from the Pax, Nkx, Dbx and Irx families. Class I proteins are repressed at different thresholds of SHH delineating ventral boundaries of progenitor domains, while class II proteins are activated at different thresholds of SHH delineating the dorsal limit of domains. Selective cross-repressive interactions between class I and class II proteins give rise to five cardinal ventral neuronal subtypes.

It is important to note that SHH is not the only signaling molecule exerting an effect on the developing neural tube. Many other molecules, pathways and mechanisms are active (e.g., RA, FGF, BMP),  and complex interactions between SHH and other molecules are possible. BMPs are suggested to play a critical role in determining the sensitivity of neural cell to SHH signaling. Evidence supporting this comes from studies using BMP inhibitors that ventralize the fate of the neural plate cell for a given SHH concentration. On the other hand, mutation in BMP antagonists (e.g., noggin) produces severe defects in the ventral-most characteristics of the spinal cord, followed by ectopic expression of BMP in the ventral neural tube. Interactions of SHH with Fgf and RA have not yet been studied in molecular detail.

Morphogenetic activity 
The concentration- and time-dependent, cell-fate-determining activity of SHH in the ventral neural tube makes it a prime example of a morphogen. In vertebrates, SHH signaling in the ventral portion of the neural tube is most notably responsible for the induction of floor plate cells and motor neurons. SHH emanates from the notochord and ventral floor plate of the developing neural tube to create a concentration gradient that spans the dorso-ventral axis and is antagonized by an inverse Wnt gradient, which specifies the dorsal spinal chord. Higher concentrations of the SHH ligand are found in the most ventral aspects of the neural tube and notochord, while lower concentrations are found in the more dorsal regions of the neural tube. The SHH concentration gradient has been visualized in the neural tube of mice engineered to express a SHH::GFP fusion protein to show this graded distribution of SHH during the time of ventral neural tube patterning.

It is thought that the SHH gradient works to elicit multiple different cell fates by a concentration- and time-dependent mechanism that induces a variety of transcription factors in the ventral progenitor cells. Each of the ventral progenitor domains expresses a highly individualized combination of transcription factors—Nkx2.2, Olig2, Nkx6.1, Nkx6.2, Dbx1, Dbx2, Irx3, Pax6, and Pax7—that is regulated by the SHH gradient. These transcription factors are induced sequentially along the SHH concentration gradient with respect to the amount and time of exposure to SHH ligand. As each population of progenitor cells responds to the different levels of SHH protein, they begin to express a unique combination of transcription factors that leads to neuronal cell fate differentiation. This SHH-induced differential gene expression creates sharp boundaries between the discrete domains of transcription factor expression, which ultimately patterns the ventral neural tube.

The spatial and temporal aspect of the progressive induction of genes and cell fates in the ventral neural tube is illustrated by the expression domains of two of the most well-characterized transcription factors, Olig2 and Nkx2.2. Early in development, the cells at the ventral midline have only been exposed to a low concentration of SHH for a relatively short time and express the transcription factor Olig2. The expression of Olig2 rapidly expands in a dorsal direction concomitantly with the continuous dorsal extension of the SHH gradient over time. However, as the morphogenetic front of SHH ligand moves and begins to grow more concentrated, cells that are exposed to higher levels of the ligand respond by switching off Olig2 and turning on Nkx2.2, creating a sharp boundary between the cells expressing the transcription factor Nkx2.2 ventral to the cells expressing Olig2. It is in this way that each of the domains of the six progenitor cell populations are thought to be successively patterned throughout the neural tube by the SHH concentration gradient. Mutual inhibition between pairs of transcription factors expressed in neighboring domains contributes to the development of sharp boundaries; however, in some cases, inhibitory relationship has been found even between pairs of transcription factors from more distant domains. Particularly, NKX2-2 expressed in the V3 domain is reported to inhibit IRX3 expressed in V2 and more dorsal domains, although V3 and V2 are separated by a further domain termed MN.

SHH expression in the frontonasal ectodermal zone (FEZ), which is a signaling center that is responsible for the patterned development of the upper jaw, regulates craniofacial development mediating through the miR-199 family in the FEZ. Specifically, SHH-dependent signals from the brain regulate genes of the miR-199 family with downregulations of the miR-199 genes increasing SHH expression and resulting in wider faces, while upregulations of the miR-199 genes decrease SHH expression resulting in narrow faces.

Tooth development 
SHH plays a very important role in organogenesis and, most importantly, craniofacial development. Being that SHH is a signaling molecule, it primarily works by diffusion along a concentration gradient, affecting cells in different manners. In early tooth development, SHH is released from the primary enamel knot—a signaling center—to provide positional information in both a lateral and planar signaling pattern in tooth development and regulation of tooth cusp growth. SHH in particular is needed for growth of epithelial cervical loops, where the outer and inner epitheliums join and form a reservoir for dental stem cells. After the primary enamel knots are apoptosed, the secondary enamel knots are formed. The secondary enamel knots secrete SHH in combination with other signaling molecules to thicken the oral ectoderm and begin patterning the complex shapes of the crown of a tooth during differentiation and mineralization. In a knockout gene model, absence of SHH is indicative of holoprosencephaly. However, SHH activates downstream molecules of Gli2 and Gli3. Mutant Gli2 and Gli3 embryos have abnormal development of incisors that are arrested in early tooth development as well as small molars.

Lung development 
Although SHH is most commonly associated with brain and limb digit development, it is also important in lung development. Studies using qPCR and knockouts have demonstrated that SHH contributes to embryonic lung development. The mammalian lung branching occurs in the epithelium of the developing bronchi and lungs. SHH expressed throughout the foregut endoderm (innermost of three germ layers) in the distal epithelium, where the embryonic lungs are developing. This suggests that SHH is partially responsible for the branching of the lungs. Further evidence of SHH's role in lung branching has been seen with qPCR. SHH expression occurs in the developing lungs around embryonic day 11 and is strongly expressed in the buds of the fetal lungs but low in the developing bronchi. Mice who are deficient in SHH can develop tracheoesophageal fistula (abnormal connection of the esophagus and trachea). Additionally, a double (SHH-/- ) knockout mouse model exhibited poor lung development. The lungs of the SHH double knockout failed to undergo lobation and branching (i.e., the abnormal lungs only developed one branch, compared to an extensively branched phenotype of the wildtype).

Potential regenerative function 
Sonic hedgehog may play a role in mammalian hair cell regeneration. By modulating retinoblastoma protein activity in rat cochlea, sonic hedgehog allows mature hair cells that normally cannot return to a proliferative state to divide and differentiate. Retinoblastoma proteins suppress cell growth by preventing cells from returning to the cell cycle, thereby preventing proliferation. Inhibiting the activity of Rb seems to allow cells to divide. Therefore, sonic hedgehog—identified as an important regulator of Rb—may also prove to be an important feature in regrowing hair cells after damage.

SHH is important for regulating dermal adipogenesis by hair follicle transit-amplifying cells (HF-TACs). Specifically, SHH induces dermal angiogenesis by acting directly on adipocyte precursors and promoting their proliferation through their expression of the peroxisome proliferator-activated receptor γ (Pparg) gene.

Processing 
SHH undergoes a series of processing steps before it is secreted from the cell. Newly synthesised SHH weighs 45 kDa and is referred to as the preproprotein. As a secreted protein, it contains a short signal sequence at its N-terminus, which is recognised by the signal recognition particle during the translocation into the endoplasmic reticulum (ER), the first step in protein secretion. Once translocation is complete, the signal sequence is removed by signal peptidase in the ER. There, SHH undergoes autoprocessing to generate a 20 kDa N-terminal signaling domain (SHH-N) and a 25 kDa C-terminal domain with no known signaling role. The cleavage is catalysed by a protease within the C-terminal domain. During the reaction, a cholesterol molecule is added to the C-terminus of SHH-N. Thus, the C-terminal domain acts as an intein and a cholesterol transferase. Another hydrophobic moiety, a palmitate, is added to the alpha-amine of N-terminal cysteine of SHH-N. This modification is required for efficient signaling, resulting in a 30-fold increase in potency over the non-palmitylated form and is carried out by a member of the membrane-bound O-acyltransferase family Protein-cysteine N-palmitoyltransferase HHAT.

Robotnikinin 
A potential inhibitor of the Hedgehog signaling pathway has been found and dubbed "Robotnikinin"—in honour of Sonic the Hedgehog's nemesis, Dr. Ivo "Eggman" Robotnik.

Former controversy surrounding name 
The gene has been linked to a condition known as holoprosencephaly, which can result in severe brain, skull and facial defects, causing a few clinicians and scientists to criticize the name on the grounds that it sounds too frivolous. It has been noted that mention of a mutation in a sonic hedgehog gene might not be well received in a discussion of a serious disorder with a patient or their family. This controversy has largely died down, and the name is now generally seen as a humorous relic of the time before the rise of fast, cheap complete genome sequencing and standardized nomenclature. The problem of the "inappropriateness" of the names of genes such as "Mothers against decapentaplegic", "Lunatic fringe", and "Sonic hedgehog" is largely avoided by using standardized abbreviations when speaking with patients and their families.

Gallery

See also 
 Pikachurin, a retinal protein named after Pikachu
 Zbtb7, an oncogene which was originally named "Pokémon"

References

Further reading

External links 

 An introductory article on SHH at Davidson College
 Rediscovering biology: Unit 7 Genetics of development .. Expert interview transcripts interview with John Incardona PhD .. explanation of the discovery and naming of the sonic hedgehog gene
 ‘Sonic Hedgehog’ sounded funny at first .. New York Times November 12, 2006 ..
 GeneReviews/NCBI/NIH/UW entry on Anophthalmia / Microphthalmia Overview
 SHH – sonic hedgehog US National Library of Medicine
 
 

Proteins
Morphogens
HINT domain
Cell signaling
Ligands (biochemistry)
Genes on human chromosome 7
Sonic the Hedgehog